Circuit de Wallonie is a cycling race held annually in Belgium since 1966. It has been part of the UCI Europe Tour as a category 1.2 race since 2011. Until 2003 the race was held under the name Circuit du Hainaut.

Winners

References

External links

Cycle races in Belgium
UCI Europe Tour races
Recurring sporting events established in 1966
1966 establishments in Belgium